The Apartment Above (Piętro wyżej in Polish) is a Polish film comedy directed by Leon Trystan in 1937, based on a script written by Emanuel Szlechter, Ludwik Starski and Eugeniusz Bodo.

Plot 

The Apartment Above is a comedy of errors that tells the story of the adventures of two neighbors in a tenement house at 13 Szczęśliwa Street: the older Hipolit Pączek (who lives below) and the younger Henryk Pączek (a tenant living one floor above). Apart from their last names, they share almost everything. The former is a classical music lover, while the latter is a well-known radio announcer and jazzman. They wage constant war with each other, as the owner of the tenement cannot remove the troublesome tenant. The situation is further complicated by the arrival of Hipolit's young relative named Lodzia, with whom (with reciprocity) Henry falls in love.

In addition to situational comedy and witty dialogues, the success of the film was also ensured by songs that turned out to be hits("Sexapil - it's our woman's weapon", "I made an appointment with her for nine o'clock") performed by Eugeniusz Bodo.

Cast 

 Eugeniusz Bodo - Henryk Pączek, radio announcer
 Jozef Orwid - Hipolit Pączek, owner of a tenement house
 Helena Grossówna - Lodzia, niece of Hipolit Pączek
 Ludwik Sempoliński - Kulka-Kulkiewicz, the golden young man
 Stanisław Woliński - Protazy, Hipolit Pączek's servant
 Czesław Skonieczny - Damazy, servant of Henryk Pączek
 Alina Zeliska - Alicja Bonecka, Lodzi's friend
 Feliks Chmurkowski - Stefan Bonecki, Alicja's father
 Julian Krzewinski - director of Polish Radio
 Ludwik Perski - musician playing clarinet and saxophone
 Stefan Laskowski - musician who played the double bass
 Wincenty Łoskot - musician playing bassoon
 Mieczyslaw Bil-Bilażewski - announcer at the masked ball
 Aleksander Suchcicki - radio employee.

Production 
The Apartment Above was produced by the Sphinx studio Urania-Film under the direction of Witold Dybowski. The direction of the film was assigned to Leon Trystan, while the script for it was written by Emanuel Szlechter, Ludwik Starski and Eugeniusz Bodo. The latter also took artistic direction of the film. Music for The Floor Above was composed by Henryk Wars, composing the songs "Sexapil - it's our woman's weapon", "made an appointment with her for nine o'clock," and "Today this one, tomorrow that one" to Szlechter's words. Seweryn Steinwurzel was responsible for the film's cinematography.

Reception 
In the trade weekly illustrated magazine Kino, there was a positive review of The Apartment Above: "...at last a very good Polish film comedy (...) A Apartment Above in film development". A review in Nasz Przegląd praised the comedy for the fact that "the humor derived from moral motifs transforms with the development of the plot into comedy reminiscent of the Marx Brothers' [Marx] surrealist humor". On the other hand, The Apartment Above was heavily criticized in right-wing circles. Mieczyslaw Hoszowski wrote the following about the film:They found people who showed shamelessness on the screen to the masses and made them believe it was the height of artistry. Then they defined stupidity as humor, wit or comedy, and the uncritical masses went along with it because it suited their low instincts. Combining both, they created a revue film and a film comedy, and with the help of appropriate advertising, they won over not only the masses, but also - "the intelligentsia".Also, the reviewer of the right-wing Prosto z mostu A. Mikulowski expressed disapproval of the Mae West parody scene: when "Bodo appears dressed as a woman, arousing the enthusiasm of the less picky audience, then the hands folded in applause fall down". An anonymous review in Gazeta Polska stated: "The film as a whole is banal. The interiors are thoroughly unsightly. [...]. The unfortunate idea with a radio speaker dressed as Mae West sinks seriously into vulgarity".

Years later, The Apartment Above was reviewed favorably. Paula Apanowicz of the Oldcamera.pl portal stated that Trystan's film was "a journey into a distant era - an encounter with a laughing interwar, feeling on the back of one's neck the cool breath of the catastrophe that was about to happen in a moment". Lukasz Budnik of Film.org.pl emphasized that The Apartment Above is "one of the most valuable films of that time [the interwar period], considered by many today to be the best"

Film Awards 
1938 - Lviv (Film Festival within the framework of the Eastern Fair) - award of the Supreme Council of the Film Industry.

References

Bibliography 

 Paula Apanowicz: "The Apartment Above" - An unforgettable comedy of pre-war Poland. OldCamera.pl, 2020-04-20 [accessed 2020-11-18]. (Polish).
 Łukasz Budnik: THE APARTMENT ABOVE. 80 years since the premiere. Film.org.pl, 2017-02-18. [Accessed 2020-11-18].
 Marek Hendrykowski. Around the definition of film parody. "Images. The International Journal of European Film, Performing Arts and Audiovisual Communication." 14 (23), pp. 29-38, 2014. ISSN 1731-450x.
 Sebastian Jagielski. Queer theory and Polish cinema. "Cultural Studies Review." 13 (3), pp. 256-272, 2012. ISSN 1895-975X.
 Iwona Kurz: Leprechaun or qui pro quo, or the body in the film culture of the interwar period. In: The body and sexuality in Polish cinema. Sebastian Jagielski, Agnieszka Morstin-Popławska (eds.). Kraków: Jagiellonian University Publishing House, 2009, pp. 13-23. ISBN 978-83-233-2642-7.
 Arkadiusz Lewicki. Transgender/transvestitism/cross-dressing in Polish cinema. "Journalism and Media." 11, pp. 49-56, 2020. DOI: 10.19195/2082-8322.11.5. ISSN 2082-8322. [accessed 2020-12-30].
 Film reviews, "Our Review" (63), 1937, p. 6.
 Wandering through the cinemas. "The Apartment Above," "Gazeta Polska" (66), 1937, p. 13.

External links 

 Piętro wyżej in filmpolski.pl
 Zdjęcia z filmu Piętro wyżej w bazie Filmoteki Narodowej „Fototeka”

1937 films
Polish comedy films